Daniel Dean may refer to:

 the defendant in the trial of Daniel Dean
 the builder of the Dean Family Farm
 Sergeant Daniel "Yoda" Dean, a character in the TV series NYC 22

 Daniel Dean (athlete) (1909–2004), American Olympic athlete